The Dogra dynasty of Dogra Rajputs from the Shiwalik Himalayas created Jammu and Kashmir when all dynastic kingdoms in India were being absorbed by the East India Company. Events led the Sikh Empire to recognise Jammu as a vassal state in 1820, and later the British added Kashmir to Jammu by the Treaty of Amritsar in 1846. The founder of the dynasty, Gulab Singh, was an influential noble in the court of the Sikh emperor Maharaja Ranjit Singh, while his brother Dhian Singh served as the prime minister of the Sikh Empire.  Appointed by Ranjit Singh as the hereditary Raja of the Jammu principality, Gulab Singh established his supremacy over all the hill states surrounding the Kashmir Valley. After the First Anglo-Sikh War in 1846, under the terms of the Treaty of Lahore, 1846, the British Indian government acquired Kashmir from the Sikh Empire and transferred it to Gulab Singh, recognising him as an independent Maharaja. Thus, Jammu and Kashmir was established as one of the largest princely states in British India, receiving a 21-gun salute for its Maharaja in 1921. It was ruled by Gulab Singh and his descendants till 1947.

The last ruling Maharaja of Jammu and Kashmir was Hari Singh, who contributed troops to the British war effort in World War II and served on Churchill's Imperial War Cabinet. Following the Partition of India in 1947, Hari Singh faced a rebellion in the western districts of the state and a Pakistan - supported tribal invasion, leading him to accede to the Union of India and receive military assistance. Pakistan contested the accession, giving rise to the enduring Kashmir conflict.

With India's support, the popular leader of Jammu and Kashmir, Sheikh Mohammad Abdullah, forced the Maharaja to abdicate in favour of his son, Yuvraj (Crown Prince) Karan Singh, who subsequently accepted the position of a constitutional head of state (Sadr-i-Riyasat) and voluntarily gave up the title of Maharaja.

Etymology
The term Dogra is thought to derive from Durgara, the name of a kingdom mentioned in an eleventh century copper-plate inscription in Chamba. In medieval times the term became Dugar, which later turned into Dogra. Kalhana's Rajatarangini makes no mention of a kingdom by this name, but it could have been referred to by its capital (ether Vallapura, modern Balor, or Babbapura, modern Babor). In modern times, the term Dogra turned into an ethnic identity, claimed by all those people that speak the Dogri language.

The family of Raja Gulab Singh is referred to as Jamwal (or Jamuwal). According to some accounts, Raja Kapur Dev, who ruled the area of Jammu around 1560 AD had two sons named Jag Dev and Samail Dev. The two sons ruled from the Bahu and Jammu on the opposite banks of the Tawi River and their descendants came to be called Bahuwals and Jamuwals respectively. The members of the family however claim descent from a legendary Suryavanshi (solar) dynasty ruler Jambu Lochan, who is believed to have founded the city of Jammu in antiquity.

History of Jamwal rulers

Raja Dhruv Dev laid down the foundations of the Jamwal rulers of Jammu in 1703.

His son Raja Ranjit Dev (1728–1780), introduced social reforms such as a ban on sati (immolation of the wife on the pyre of the husband) and female infanticide.

Raja Ranjit Dev was succeeded by Raja Braj Dev who killed his brother and nephew to become king. Braj Dev was killed during the Sikh invasion of Jammu in 1787. His infant son Raja Sampuran Singh (1787–1797) succeeded with Jammu becoming an autonomous tributary under the Sikh Confederacy Misls. Sampuran Singh with no issue, was succeeded by his uncle Raja Jit Singh.

Jit Singh was involved in another conflict with the Sikh empire, which he lost and was exiled into British territory. With Jammu fully annexed by the Sikhs around 1808, Ranjit Singh first allotted it to his son Kharak Singh. However, Kharak Singh's agents were unable to maintain law and order, with locals led by Mian Dedo rebelling against the Sikh jagirdar (governor). In 1820, Ranjit Singh then bestowed the territory as a hereditary fiefdom to Gulab Singh's father Kishore Singh, a distant kinsman of Raja Jit Singh. On his father's death in 1822, Jammu passed to Gulab Singh.

Gulab Singh

Around 1808, Jammu became part of the Sikh Empire, under Maharaja Ranjit Singh. Ranjit Singh in 1820, bestowed the place as a jagir on Gulab Singh's father Kishore Singh, who belonged to the Jamwal Rajput clan that ruled Jammu. As a jagirdar (governor) for the Sikhs, Gulab Singh extended the boundaries of the Sikh Empire to western Tibet with the help of his fine General Zorawar Singh. The Sikh rule was then extended beyond the Jammu Region and the Kashmir Valley to include the Tibetan Buddhist Kingdom of Ladakh and the Emirates of Hunza, Gilgit and Nagar.

In the turmoil for succession of the Sikh empire that followed Maharaja Ranjit Singh's death in 1839, two of Gulab Singh's sons Udham Singh, and Sohan Singh were killed in the feuding between the Sikh heirs. His youngest brother Suchet Singh, was killed by his own nephew Hira Singh, the Vizir (prime minister) of the Sikh empire. Hira Singh, was a great favourite of Maharaja Ranjit Singh and Gulab Singh once even aspired to have him installed as the Sikh emperor. Hira Singh had become prime minister aged 24, after his father and Gulab Singh's brother Vizir Dhian Singh was assassinated in his blotched September 1843 coup d'état against Sikh emperor Sher Singh in Lahore. During the regency of Maharani Jind Kaur, Hira Singh was killed by the Sikh army in December 1844.

Gulab Singh, came into possession of the Koh-i-noor diamond, after Maharaja Kharak Singh's mysterious death in prison in 1840, and had previously presented the famous stone to Maharaja Sher Singh to win his favour.

After the First Anglo-Sikh War in 1846, Sir Henry Lawrence was appointed British Resident and Vizir Lal Singh on behalf of infant emperor Duleep Singh was asked to surrender Kashmir. Vizir Lal Singh was also a Dogra, and along with Gulab Singh colluded with the British to deliberately break the Sikh army and facilitate the British victory.

Under the terms of the Treaty of Amritsar that followed in March 1846, the British government sold Kashmir for a sum of 7.5 million Nanakshahee rupees to Gulab Singh, hereafter bestowed with the title of Maharaja. Thus the Princely State of Jammu and Kashmir came into being under Gulab Singh, as per the treaty of Lahore, signed between the British and the Sikhs.

Maharaja Partab Singh (enthroned in 1885) saw the construction of Banihal Cart Road (B.C. Road) mainly to facilitate telegraph services. During WWI he provided one Mountain Battery and three Infantry Battalions to fight for the British in East Africa, Palestine and Mesopotamia. For the services of his troops the state was awarded a hereditary 21-guns salute.

One of the main residences of the maharajas was the Sher Garhi Palace in their summer capital Srinagar.

List of Maharajas of Jammu and Kashmir (1846–1952)

Gulab Singh (1846–1856)
Ranbir Singh (1856–1885)
Pratap Singh (1885–1925)
Hari Singh (1925–1952) (Monarchy abolished)
Karan Singh (Titular) (1952–1961)

Family tree

 I. Gulab Singh, Maharaja of Jammu and Kashmir (1792–1857; Maharaja: 1846 (abdicated 1856))
  II. Ranbir Singh, Maharaja of Jammu and Kashmir GCSI, CIE (1830–1885; r. 1856–1885)
 III. Pratap Singh, Maharaja of Jammu and Kashmir GCSI, GCIE, GBE (1848–1925; r. 1885–1925)
 Raja Amar Singh KCSI (1864–1909)
  IV. Hari Singh, Maharaja of Jammu and Kashmir GCSI, GCIE, GCVO  (1895–1961; r. 1925–1947; titular Maharaja: 1952–1961)
 V. Karan Singh, President of Jammu and Kashmir (b. 1931; Regent of Jammu and Kashmir: 1949–1952; Sadar-e-Riyasat (President) of Jammu and Kashmir: 1952–1965; Governor of Jammu and Kashmir: 1965–1967;
Vikramaditya Singh (born 1964)
Martand Singh (b. 1992)
Ajatshatru Singh (born 1966)
Ranvijay Singh (born 1993)

The last ruling Maharaja of Jammu and Kashmir

The last ruler of Jammu and Kashmir was Maharaja Hari Singh, who ascended the throne in 1925. He made primary education compulsory in the State, introduced laws prohibiting child marriage and allowed low castes to go to places of worship. Hari Singh was as a member of Churchill's British War Cabinet in WWII, and supplied troops for the Allies.

Singh's reign saw the accession of Jammu and Kashmir to the newly independent Indian Union in 1947. He originally manoeuvered to maintain his independence by playing off India and Pakistan against each other. There was an armed movement against the Maharaja's rule especially in the Poonch district of Jammu, when his troops were unable to control these fighters and his troops retreated to Jammu, in October 1947, Singh appealed to India for its help. He acceded to India, though there is considerable controversy over exactly at what point, and whether or not his accession included the sovereignty of the state.

In June 1952, Singh's rule was terminated by the state government of Indian-administered Kashmir. His son Yuvraj (Crown Prince) Karan Singh too abdicated and was elected Sadr-e-Riyasat ('President of the Province') and Governor of the State in 1964.

Dogras in Politics post 1952
Yuvraj (Crown Prince) Karan Singh after serving as the President of Jammu and Kashmir from 1952 to 1964 would go on to become the youngest cabinet minister as a leading member the Indian Congress Party in 1967. He was also the Indian Ambassador to the US in 1989. His elder son Vikramaditya Singh was a member of the Peoples Democratic Party. Currently in Congress party Karan Singh's younger son Ajatshatru Singh was a member of the National Conference (NC) headed by Omar Abdullah, grandson of Sheikh Abdullah who had abolished the monarchy in 1952. Ajatshatru Singh had served with the NC as a minister in the Jammu and Kashmir Government from 1996 to 2002. In 2014 he quit the NC to join the BJP, stating that he had done so to satisfy the "people’s desire to have a corruption and dynasty-free government".

Ankit Love, son of Bhim Singh the founder of Jammu and Kashmir National Panthers Party, claimed to be the "Emperor (Maharaja) of the Sovereign State of Jammu and Kashmir" when he was candidate in the 2016 London Mayoral Election, and again in the 2016 Richmond Park by-election for the United Kingdom parliament.

See also
Jammu and Kashmir
Kashmir region
List of Hindu Empires and Dynasties

Notes

References

Bibliography

External links

 Kashmir and Jammu, The Imperial Gazetteer of India, 1909, v. 15, p. 71.
 Conflict in Kashmir: Selected Internet Resources by the Library, University of California, Berkeley, USA; University of California at Berkeley Library Bibliographies and Web-Bibliographies list

Hindu dynasties
Rajput rulers
Jammu and Kashmir (princely state)
Maharajas of Jammu and Kashmir
Dogra
Rajputs
Dynasties of the Rajputs
Indian royalty
1952 disestablishments in India
1846 establishments in India